Roberts Island is an island in the San Joaquin River delta, in California. It is part of San Joaquin County, and managed by Reclamation Districts 544 (Upper Roberts Island), 524 (Middle Roberts Island) and 684 (Lower Roberts Island).

References

Islands of San Joaquin County, California
Islands of the Sacramento–San Joaquin River Delta
Islands of Northern California